Darrell Rooney is a Canadian animator, storyboard artist, and director for The Walt Disney Company, best known for directing The Lion King II: Simba's Pride (1998) and Mulan II (2004) at Disneytoon Studios. He started at Disney in 1978, and worked as a visual effects animator on Tron (1982).

He was nominated for an Annie Award in 2001 for Outstanding Individual Achievement for Directing in an Animated Feature Production for directing Lady and the Tramp II: Scamp's Adventure.

Filmography
2001: Lady and the Tramp II: Scamp's Adventure – Director

References

External links

Living people
20th-century births
Canadian animated film directors
Canadian storyboard artists
Canadian expatriates in the United States
Walt Disney Animation Studios people